Mamiá River may refer to rivers in Brazil:

 Mamiá River (Amazonas)
 Mamiá River (Pará)